The 1582 Cagayan battles were a series of clashes between the forces of the Spanish Philippines led by Captain Juan Pablo de Carrión and wokou (possibly led by Japanese pirates) headed by Tay Fusa. These battles, which took place in the vicinity of the Cagayan River, finally resulted in a Spanish victory.

This event is a recorded battle between European soldiers and sailors against Japanese pirates, which followed similar events like the battles of Manila and Fukuda Bay. The clash pitted Spanish musketeers, pikemen, rodeleros and sailors assisted by allied native warriors against a larger group of Japanese, Chinese, and likely native Filipino pirates made up of rōnin, soldiers, fishermen, and merchants (smugglers and legitimate). The pirates had a large junk, and 18 sampans which are flat bottomed, wooden fishing boats.

Prelude

Around 1573, the Japanese began to exchange gold for silver on the Philippine island of Luzon, especially in the provinces of Cagayan, Metro Manila, and Pangasinan, specifically the Lingayen area. In 1580, however, a ragtag group of pirates forced the natives of Cagayan into submission. These raiders were called Wokou, and had been previously fought by the Chinese Jiajing Emperor.

In response, the Governor-General of the Philippines Gonzalo Ronquillo commissioned Juan Pablo de Carrión, hidalgo and a captain of the Spanish navy, to deal with the piracy.

Ronquillo wrote to King Philip II on 16 June 1582:

Carrión took the initiative and shelled a Wokou ship, possibly of Chinese manufacture, in the South China Sea, removing it from action. A retaliation came from Tay Fusa, who sailed toward the Philippine archipelago with a fleet.

Opposing forces
The Wokou fleet was composed of one junk and 18 sampans. Although their numbers were composed of Japanese, Chinese, and Philippine raiders, the name of their leader suggests the Japanese led their fleet. Spanish sources record it as Tay Fusa, which does not correspond to a Japanese name but could be a transliteration of Taifu-sama, with taifu (大夫) being a word for a Japanese medieval chieftain, also pronounced as tāi-hu in Hokkien Chinese, or dàfū in Mandarin Standard Chinese. They carried not only bladed weapons, but also muskets, which had been provided by the Portuguese.

To counter this, Carrión gathered forty soldiers and seven boats: five small support vessels, a light ship (San Yusepe), and a galleon (La Capitana), with their respective crews. Though lesser in numbers, the Spanish were advantaged by their greater experience with firearms than the pirates, as well as the superior quality of their armor and weaponry. Some Chinese sources claim that the Japanese pirates were not very good at firing their muskets, which is believed to be due to a shortage of good powder.  However, during the Japanese invasions of Korea (1592–98), the Japanese musketeers had significant superiority in accuracy and range against Korean archers.

Battle

As they passed the Cape Bojeador, the Spanish flotilla encountered a heavy Wokou sampan. It had recently arrived at the coast and its sailors were abusing the native population. Carrión, although outnumbered by the Wokou, engaged in naval battle with the sampan, eventually boarding it. The Spanish rodeleros then encountered armored Japanese Wokou wielding swords. Though initially successful, the Spanish soldiers were repelled back to their own ship, whose deck became a battlefield. Eventually the Spanish turned the battle again in their favor by improvising a parapet with Spanish pikemen at front and arquebusiers and musketeers at the rear, thanks to the well-timed reinforcement of the rest of the fleet. The Wokou abandoned the ships and swam away, with some of them drowning due to the weight of their armor. The Spanish had suffered their first casualties, among them the galley's captain Pedro Lucas.

The flotilla continued down the Cagayán River, finding a fleet of eighteen sampans and a Wokou fort erected inland. The Spanish fleet forced their way through using artillery and disembarked onshore. They dug in, assembling the artillery unloaded from the galleon in the trenches, and continually bombarded the pirates. The Wokou decided to negotiate a surrender and Carrión ordered them to leave Luzon. The pirates asked for gold in compensation for the losses they would suffer if they left, which was denied outright by Carrión. After this, the Wokou decided to attack by land with a force of some six hundred strong.

The Spanish trenches, manned by both soldiers and sailors, endured a first assault, then another. In response to their pikes being seized by the Wokou soldiers, the Spanish oiled the shafts of their pikes in order to make them difficult to grasp. The Spanish were running low on gun powder by the third attack, which became a close-quarters fight that almost breached the trenches. Finally, with the Wokou assaults diminishing, the Spanish emerged from the trenches and attacked, routing the remaining Wokou. They then plundered the Wokou weapons left on the battlefield, which included katanas and armor, and kept them as trophies.

Aftermath
With the region pacified, and the arrival of reinforcements, Carrión founded the city of Nueva Segovia (now Lal-lo). Pirate activity was sparse afterwards, although the impression left by the fierceness of the battle led the local Spanish viceroy to request more troops. The commercial activity near Cagayan was focused in Lingayen Bay, in Pangasinan, on the port of Agoo and consisted principally of deerskin trade.

Notes
A. Carta de Juan Bautista Román, factor y veedor de la Real Hacienda de Filipinas, al virrey de Nueva España dando cuenta de la expedición del capitán Juan Pablo de Carrión a Cagayán para expulsar a los japoneses que estaban allí poblados. Fue con una pequeña armada, por el camino peleó con un corsario chino al que rindió, y al doblar el cabo Bojeador topó con un navío japonés, con quienes se entabló una batalla hasta que los españoles consiguieron rendirlos. Carrión subió por el río Cagayán, hallando a la entrada un fuerte con navíos japoneses. Los españoles anduvieron por el río desperdigados y Carrión se hizo fuerte en un estero, resistiendo allí ataques de los japoneses. Juan Bautista Román expone la necesidad que tienen de socorro. (Cat. 2814)
B. Real Cédula al conde de Coruña, virrey de Nueva España, comunicándole que, según informa el capitán Gabriel de Rivera que vino de Filipinas, en una jornada que hizo el gobernador Gonzalo Ronquillo al río de Cagayan se perdieron algunos españoles, y que para reparar esta falta y poblar esas islas convenía se llevasen a ellas hasta doscientos hombres. Se encarga al virrey que atienda esta petición y los envíe desde Nueva España, además de otros doscientos que se le encargaron desde Lisboa. (Cat. 2999) Nota: Corresponde a imagen nº 600-601

See also 
 Siege of Moji (1561) – A Portuguese carrack joins a Japanese battle in what became the first European naval bombardment on Japanese soil
 Battle of Fukuda Bay (1565) – A Japanese flotilla attacks a Portuguese carrack and fails to capture it in the first naval clash between Japan and the West
 Battle of Manila (1574) - A Chinese and Japanese pirate fleet attacked Manila with the goal to capture the city
 Nossa Senhora da Graça incident (1610) – A Japanese flotilla attacks a Portuguese carrack that ends in the latter's sinking
 Second Attack on Kamaishi (9 August 1945) – last-ever direct naval bombardment of the Japanese home islands in World War II

References

Bibliography 
 Antony, Robert J.: Elusive Pirates, Pervasive Smugglers: Violence and Clandestine Trade in the Greater China Seas, pp. 82-83
 Borao, José Eugenio (2005). «La colonia de japoneses en Manila en el marco de las relaciones de Filipinas y Japón en los siglos XVI y XVII». Cuadernos Canela (Tokio: Confederación Académica Nipona, Española y Latinoaméricana) (17): 25-53. ISSN 1344-9109 (Spanish)
 
 Sola, Emilio (1999). Historia de un desencuentro: España y Japón, 1580-1614. Fugaz Ediciones. p. 24. .

1582 in the Spanish Empire
History of the Philippines (1565–1898)
History of Cagayan
Naval battles involving Spain
Naval battles involving pirates
Naval battles involving Japan